WVMC-FM is a listener supported contemporary Christian music radio station in Mansfield, Ohio on a frequency of 90.7 MHz.  It operates translator stations in Ashland, Ohio (91.1 MHz), and in Wooster, Ohio (102.7 MHz).

The station signed on in 1979 from Mansfield Christian School, the original owner of the station.

WVMC aired a Christian CHR/Hit format provided by the WAY-FM Network until July 1, 2013, when WAY-FM ceased providing programming via satellite to non-owned stations.  At that time, the station switched to a contemporary Praise and Worship Music format branded as "Total Praise."

Effective April 13, 2021, Mansfield Christian School sold WVMC-FM and translators W216AH and W274AN to Soaring Eagle Promotions, Inc.

On December 17, 2021, the station was rebranded as "Rise FM".

References

External links
WVMC-FM website
 

Contemporary Christian radio stations in the United States
Radio stations established in 1979
1979 establishments in Ohio
VMC-FM